Sukabumi is a landlocked city surrounded by the regency of the same name (enclave) in the southern foothills of Mount Gede, in West Java, Indonesia, about  south of the national capital, Jakarta.

The area around Sukabumi is also a popular destination for whitewater rafting. Tea and Rubber production is a major industry in the area. The suburban area surrounding Sukabumi circling the mountain has grown tremendously in population, such that northern Sukabumi Regency, hugging the volcano, and bordering Greater Jakarta, is home to the bulk of the regency's population.  

The area of the city is 48.33 km2, and the population at the 2010 Census was 300,359, while the 2020 Census was 346,325; the official estimate as at mid 2021 was 350,804. However, some 1.8 million people, as of the 2010 census figures, live in the surrounding metropolitan area. The bulk of the metro area population is unusual in that it forms a narrow southwest ring around Mount Gede.  The eastern portion of the ringed population belt continues on to Cianjur Regency.

History

Early history
The area around Sukabumi was already inhabited at least in the 11th century. The first written record found in this area was the Sanghyang Tapak inscription in Cibadak, 20 km west of the city. Written in Kawi script, the stone tells about the prohibition of fishing activity in the nearby river by the authorities of the Sunda Kingdom.

At the end of the 16th century, the area was captured by the Banten Sultanate, after the fall of the Sunda Kingdom. The area however became contested in the 1620s between Banten, the Mataram Sultanate in the east and the Batavia-based Dutch East India Company. After a series of military clashes between them, the area was included in a buffer zone territory between Banten and Mataram, although the area is considered de jure as a part of Mataram.

In 1677, after the Dutch forced Mataram to sign a series of unequal treaties as a consequence of Dutch assistance for quelling the Trunajaya rebellion, Sukabumi came under direct control of Tjiandjoer. By that time, there were only few rural Sundanese settlements existed, one of the largest was Tjikole.

Colonial Sukabumi

Sukabumi Coffee Plantations
The area around the present-day Sukabumi (or Soekaboemi in Van Ophuijsen Spelling System) began to develop in the 18th century when the Dutch East India Company started to open coffee plantation areas in the western Priangan region of Java. Due to the high demands of coffee in Europe, in the year of 1709 the Dutch governor-general Abraham van Riebeeck started to open coffee plantations around the area of Tjibalagoeng (present-day Bogor), Tjiandjoer, Djogdjogan, Pondok Kopo, and Goenoeng Goeroeh. Coffee plantations in these five areas had then undergone expansion and intensification during the era of Hendrick Zwaardecroon (1718–1725), where the Tjiandjoer regent at that time Wira Tanoe III acquired territorial expansion of his regency as a compensation for more coffee plantations openings.

The growth of Goenoeng Goeroeh coffee plantation led to the establishment of small settlements around its area, one of those was the Tjikole (Cikole) hamlet, named after the nearby Tjikole River. In 1776, regent of Tjiandjoer Wira Tanoe Datar VI established the Tjikole Viceregency which were the indirect predecessor of the present-day Sukabumi Regency. The viceregency consisted of six districts of Djampang Koelon, Djampang Tengah, Goenoeng Parang, Tjiheoelang, Tjimahi, and Tjitjoeroeg. The administrative center was located in Tjikole, due to its very strategic locations for communications between Batavia and Tjiandjoer which were the capital of the Priangan Residency at that time.

Tjikole becomes Soekaboemi

After the Dutch East Indies were under the rule of the British in 1811, vast lands in the Tjikole area were bought by Stamford Raffles, the Governor-General of the Dutch East Indies at that time, via an auction held in Batavia. The name Soekaboemi was first used on 1815, when a Priangan-based plantation owner (known then as Preanger Planter) and surgeon, Andries de Wilde visited Tjikole in 1814. From his consultations with local people, De Wilde wrote a letter to Nicolaus Engelhard, a friend and plantation investor, where de Wilde asked Engelhard to propose a name change of the viceregency from Tjikole to Soekaboemi, to which Raffles agreed.

In Dutch colonial times, Soekaboemi was the site of the Politieschool, the colonial police academy. On 8 December 1941, the Empire of Japan invaded the Dutch East Indies as part of World War II and on 6 March 1942, the city came under aerial bombardment by Japanese aircraft. During this attack, both civilian targets (including houses and two schools) and strategic targets (the police academy, the railway line, and the radio station) were hit, resulting in many casualties. During the Japanese occupation, Soekaboemi became the meeting place of Mohammad Hatta and Sutan Sjahrir with representatives of the Japanese Empire to discuss the future of the Dutch East Indies, but both were given 'city prisoner' status. Soekaboemi also became one of the detention sites of American and Australian prisoners of war.

Also during the occupation, the Japanese created a strategic garrison in Ujung Genteng, part of the South Sukabumi Regency. Remains of the harbor and lookout towers at the end of this peninsula are still in place, along with the caves that the Japanese lived and died in towards the end of the war. Ujung Genteng is directly North of Christmas Island and Australia and would have made an excellent point of defense or attack, without official records to substantiate this, it is presumed that they had their sights on Christmas Island and a close link to Australia.

Present day
In early 2005, Sukabumi Regency became the first place in Indonesia that polio was reported in ten years, the beginning of a nationwide outbreak of the disease which had been believed to be eradicated in the country.

Government and politics

Administrative districts
The city of Sukabumi is divided into seven districts (kecamatan), listed below with their areas and their populations at the 2010 Census and the 2020 Census, together with the official estimates as of 2021.

Climate
Sukabumi has an elevation moderated tropical rainforest climate (Af) with moderate rainfall from July to September and heavy rainfall in the remaining months.

Transportation

After almost one year of hiatus, the railway transport between Sukabumi and Bogor of 57 kilometers was reactivated, with the new train called 'Pangrango' on 9 November 2013. The train has one executive-class car and three economy-class cars.

Bogor-Ciawi–Sukabumi Toll Road is under construction that will connect Bogor Regency, Bogor city, Sukabumi Regency and Sukabumi city. The 15.35-kilometer first section of the toll road between Ciawi and Cigombong was inaugurated by Indonesian President Joko Widodo on 3 December 2018.

Culinary
Sukabumi also has some traditional dishes that are worth trying, for example Roti Priangan, Mochi, Bandros, Soto Mie and Bubur.

Notable people
 Miel Mundt (1880–1949), football player
 Rie Cramer (1887–1977), author and illustrator
 Piet Metman (1916–1990), swimmer
 Lo van Hensbergen (1917–1987), actor and director
 Ellen Beerthuis-Roos (born 1926), sculptor

References

External links
  Official site

 
Populated places in West Java